Michael Hilary Arthur Roberts (6 May 1927 – 10 February 1983) was a British Conservative Party politician.

Early life
Roberts was born in Aberystwyth, and was educated at the Neath Grammar School for Boys and the University College of Wales, Cardiff. He was the first Headteacher of the Bishop of Llandaff Church in Wales High School when it opened in 1963, and was president of the Cardiff branch of the National Union of Teachers.

Parliamentary career
Roberts contested Aberdare in a 1954 by-election, placing third. He fought Cardiff South East in 1955 and 1959, being defeated both times by future Labour Prime Minister James Callaghan, on the second occasion by only 868 votes.

He was Member of Parliament for Cardiff North from 1970 to February 1974, and thereafter for Cardiff North West.  He became a junior Welsh Office minister when the Margaret Thatcher government came to power in 1979.

Death
At around 9:44PM on 10 February 1983, Roberts collapsed from a massive heart attack while speaking at the despatch box in the House of Commons during an adjournment debate and was pronounced dead, aged 55, on arrival at hospital. Roberts had been in poor health for two years prior to his death. Ordinarily there would have been a by-election to succeed him but none was called due to the impending 1983 general election, in which boundary changes abolished his Cardiff North West seat.

References 

Times Guide to the House of Commons, 1979

1927 births
1983 deaths
20th-century Welsh educators
20th-century Welsh politicians
Alumni of Cardiff University
Conservative Party (UK) MPs for Welsh constituencies
Members of the Parliament of the United Kingdom for Cardiff constituencies
People educated at Neath Grammar School for Boys
People from Aberystwyth
Politicians from Cardiff
UK MPs 1970–1974
UK MPs 1974
UK MPs 1974–1979
UK MPs 1979–1983